Sekhar may refer to:

Sekhar Basu, Indian nuclear scientist
Sekhar Chandra, Indian cricketer
Sekhar Das (born 1952), Bengali Movie director, scriptwriter
Ashok Sekhar Ganguly CBE, former chairman of Hindustan Lever, nominated member of the Rajya Sabha
Sekhar V. Joseph, cinematographer in Kollywood, the Tamil film based industry in South India
Sekhar Kammula, Indian film director, screenwriter and producer
Sekhar Menon, Indian actor primarily working in Malayalam cinema and a disc jockey
Sayan Sekhar Mondal (born 1989), Indian cricketer
Sukhendu Sekhar Roy, Indian politician belonging to the Trinamool Congress
Chandra Sekhar Sahu (born 1950), member of the 14th Lok Sabha of India
Chandra Sekhar Sankurathri, founder of the Sankurathri Foundation
A Saye Sekhar, Indian journalist, columnist, and a political analyst
Devineni Raja Sekhar, represents Kankipadu Assembly Constituency in Krishna District, Andhra Pradesh
G. C. Sekhar, Telugu and Tamil film director
Guna Sekhar (born 1964), Indian film director and screenwriter
Krishna Sekhar, Indian film actor
Master Sekhar, Indian film actor in Tamil film industry
Samanta Chandra Sekhar (1836–1904), Indian astrologer and scholar
T. A. Sekhar (born 1956), cricketer and medium pace bowler who represented India
V. Sekhar, Indian film director who has directed Tamil films
Vinod Sekhar, the President and Group Chief Executive of Petra Group, a Malaysian company
Sekhar Suri, Indian film director predominately works for Telugu films
Sekhar Tam Tam MBE, medical doctor, serves on the Grenada Pharmacy Council
Chandra Sekhar Yeleti (born 1973), Indian film director

See also
Silda Chandra Sekhar College, undergraduate coeducational college in Silda, Paschim Medinipur, West Bengal, India
Sekhar v. United States, United States Supreme Court decision regarding extortion under the Hobbs Act of 1946
Sehar
Seka (disambiguation)
Sekar
Sekha
Shekhar (disambiguation)